Le Bougainville is the third ship of the  of cruise ships operated by Ponant.  Each member of the class has been allocated the name of a famous French explorer, and Le Bougainville is named after Louis Antoine de Bougainville, a French admiral and explorer.

Built by VARD, Le Bougainville had her hull constructed in VARD's Tulcea yard in Romania.  By October 2018, she was ready to be transferred to the builder's Søviknes facility in Ålesund, Norway, for final outfitting.  She was delivered to Ponant in Norway in early April 2019.

On 8 April 2019, Le Bougainville departed from Søvik, Norway, for Malaga, Spain, where she began her maiden voyage on 15 April 2019.  She was christened on 4 June 2019 in Marseille.

References

External links

 Compagnie du Ponant official site page about the ship

2019 ships
Ships built in Norway
Ships built in Romania
Ships of Compagnie du Ponant